Driopea nigrofasciata is a species of beetle in the family Cerambycidae. It was described by Pic in 1926.

References

Driopea
Beetles described in 1926